X-energy is an American private nuclear reactor and fuel design engineering company. It is developing a Generation IV high-temperature gas-cooled pebble-bed nuclear reactor design. Since its founding in 2009, it has received various government grants and contracts, notably through the Department of Energy's (DOE) Advanced Reactor Concept Cooperative Agreement in 2016 and its Advanced Reactor Demonstration Program (ARDP) in 2020.

History 
The company was founded in 2009 by Kam Ghaffarian. In January 2016, X-energy was provided a five-year grant of up to $40 million, as part of the DOE's Advanced Reactor Concept Cooperative Agreement to advance elements of their reactor development. In 2019, X-energy received funding from the United States Department of Defense to develop small military reactors for use at forward bases. Former Deputy Secretary of Energy of the DOE, Clay Sell, was appointed CEO of X-energy in 2019.

In October 2020, the company was chosen by the DOE as a recipient of a matching grant totaling between $400 million and $4 billion over the next 5 to 7 years for the cost of building a demonstration reactor of their Xe-100, helium-cooled pebble-bed reactor design. This is part of the DOE's Advanced Reactor Demonstration Program, which also awarded the same grant to TerraPower.

In 2022 Curtiss-Wright agreed to act as the preferred supplier of 3 critical components of the Xe-100 reactor. The initial installation of the reactor is projected to be for Energy Northwest in Washington State.

In March 2023, X-energy and Dow Inc agreed to develop a grid-scale next-generation Xe-100 nuclear reactor at one of Dow's sites on the U.S. Gulf Coast.

Reactor design 
The Xe-100 is a proposed pebble bed high-temperature gas-cooled nuclear reactor design that is planned to be smaller, simpler and safer when compared to conventional nuclear designs. Pebble bed high temperature gas-cooled reactors were first proposed in 1944. Each reactor is planned to generate 200 MWt and approximately 76 MWe. The fuel for the Xe-100 is a spherical fuel element, or pebble, that utilizes the tristructural isotropic (TRISO) particle nuclear fuel design, with Uranium enriched to 20%, to allow for longer periods between refueling. X-energy claims that TRISO fuel will make nuclear meltdowns virtually impossible.

References

External links
Official website

Nuclear power companies of the United States